Konyaspor Kulübü (Konya Sports Club) is a Turkish professional football club based in Konya. They are better known as Konyaspor. In 1922 Konyaspor were founded with the name Konya Gençlerbirliği and have played at their current home stadium, Konya Metropolitan Municipality Stadium, since 2014. Konyaspor currently play in the Süper Lig, the top tier of Turkish football. The club colours are green and white.

History
Konyaspor were founded officially with the name Konya Gençlerbirliği on 22 June 1922. As champions of the regional Konya Football League they participated in the 1924 Turkish Football Championship, the first ever national championship in Turkish football. In 1965 the club combined with Meramspor, Selçukspor, and Çimentospor and took the name Konyaspor with black and white as the team colors, and started their first season in the Second League in 1981. Konyaspor then changed to green and white as the team colours after their merger with the cross-town rivals Konya İdman Yurdu. The new team adopted the name of Konyaspor and the colors of Konya İdman Yurdu. In 1987–88 Konyaspor became champions of the second league and were promoted to the first league for the first time in their history.

Konyaspor lasted five seasons in the first league. They played 160 official matches, ending up with 47 wins, 33 draws, and 80 losses. During the 1988–89 season Konyaspor made it to the semi-finals of the Turkish Cup, losing to eventual champions Beşiktaş. In the 1992–93 season, the club were relegated back to the second league. After spending 10 seasons in the second league, Konyaspor returned to Süper Lig as the title holders of the 2002–03 First League with 68 points. During the 2003–04 season Konyaspor made it to the quarter-finals of the Turkish Cup, but then lost to eventual champions Trabzonspor 2–1 during extra time. In 2004–05 Konyaspor advanced to the quarter-finals beating Beşiktaş 3–1, but then lost to Denizlispor 5–4 on penalty shoot-outs. In 2008–09 despite the 3–0 home win against Ankaraspor, Konyaspor couldn't avoid relegation as they remained 16th in the table with 38 points which meant their relegation from the Süper Lig. Konyaspor were in the Süper Lig since 2003. However, Konyaspor completed the TFF First League 6th and secured a position in the Promotion Play-offs in 2010. Konyaspor then won the Promotion Play-offs and made an immediate return to the Süper Lig after 1 year. They finished the Play-offs 1st with 7 points beating Adanaspor 3–1 in the first game, Karşıyaka 1–0 in the second and drawing with Altay 2–2 in the final match. But Konyaspor relegated again in the 2010–11 season.

They returned to the top level two years later. In 2015–16 Konyaspor eventually finished Süper Lig as 3rd, also the best result for them, and qualified for the UEFA Europa League. In 2016–17 they play for the first time in their history in European competitions and draw in Group H with Shakhtar Donetsk, Braga and Gent. They finished the group in fourth place with five losses, one draw and without winning any match. Also in the same season they reached the Turkish Cup final for the first time in their history. On 31 May 2017 Konyaspor defeated İstanbul Başakşehir to win their first ever Turkish Cup in the club's 95-year history. In the first Turkish Cup final since the 2007–08 season in which none of Istanbul's "big three" clubs Beşiktaş, Fenerbahçe, and Galatasaray were competing, Konyaspor against İstanbul Başakşehir finished regular and extra time tied 0–0 and won on penalty shoot-outs with a result of 4–1.

Stadium

Konya Metropolitan Municipality Stadium is a multi-use stadium in Konya, Turkey. It replaced the ageing Konya Atatürk Stadium at the end of 2013, which has been in use since the early 1950s. The stadium has a capacity of 42,000 people and is fully covered. Record attendance is 41,007 people in Turkey against Netherlands, 6 September 2015 UEFA Euro 2016 qualifying Group A match. The Konya Buyuksheir Stadium is one of Turkey's biggest stadiums with many sporting events happening there.  The national team also plays some of its games there.

Past seasons

Domestic results

League affiliation
Süper Lig: 1988–93, 2003–09, 2010–11, 2013–
TFF First League: 1965–69, 1971–79, 1980–88, 1993–03, 2009–10, 2011–13
TFF Second League: 1969–71, 1979–80
Turkish Football Championship: 1924

Honours

Leagues
1. Lig
Winners (2): 1987–88, 2002–03
2. Lig
Winners (1): 1970–71

Cups
Turkish Cup
Winners (1): 2016–17
Turkish Super Cup
Winners (1): 2017

European history

European participation

Notes
 GS: Group stage

UEFA ranking

Players

Current squad

Out on loan

Retired number(s) 

 6, retired in memory of football player Ahmet Çalık who died in a traffic accident.

Notable players

Most appearances and goals in Süper Lig

''Statistics correct as of the end of the 2016–17 season.

Club officials

Board members

Technical staff

Sponsorship and kit manufacturer

1 Main sponsorship
2 Europe Main sponsorship

See also
Konya İdman Yurdu

Notes

References

External links

Official website
Konyaspor on TFF.org

 
Sport in Konya
Football clubs in Turkey
Association football clubs established in 1922
1922 establishments in the Ottoman Empire
Süper Lig clubs